Kulcha is the debut studio album released by Australian R&B band Kulcha. The album spawned four top 30 singles and was certified gold in Australia. The album was released in September 1994.

At the ARIA Music Awards of 1995, the album was nominated for Best Pop Release; losing out to "Chains" by Tina Arena.

Track listing
 "Kulcha Feel" - 1:33
 "Don't Be Shy" - 4:10
 "Shaka Jam" - 4:08
 "Bring It On" - 3:26
 "Fly Girl" - 4:18
 "Soul Feeling" - 4:02
 "Rush Me" - 5:19
 "My Love" - 3:36
 "Be My Lady" - 4:08
 "Spend the Night" - 5:00
 "So Special" - 4:31
 "Nasty" - 4:20

Charts

Weekly charts

Certification

Release history

References

1994 debut albums
Kulcha (band) albums